Rohan Belight (born 26 January 1973) is a Jamaican cricketer. He played in one List A match for the Jamaican cricket team in 1994/95.

See also
 List of Jamaican representative cricketers

References

External links
 

1973 births
Living people
Jamaican cricketers
Jamaica cricketers
Place of birth missing (living people)